Beeville Bee-Picayune is a newspaper based in Beeville, Texas. The paper was sold by Beeville Publishing Co., Inc. to Coastal Bend Publishing, an affiliate of McElvy Media Group, effective Feb. 1, 2020. Other papers included in the deal were the Advance-Guard Press, the News of San Patricio, the Progress and Karnes Countywide.

References

Newspapers published in Texas
Bee County, Texas